Stephen Steps Out is a 1923 American silent comedy film that is notable as being the first starring role for the still teenaged Douglas Fairbanks, Jr. Directed by Joseph Henabery, it was based on a short story by Richard Harding Davis, "The Grand Cross of the Desert."
 
With this film the young Fairbanks Jr. opted for a screen career despite opposition from his famous actor father, Douglas Fairbanks.

"I was terribly chubby," recalled Fairbanks Jr. "Did it for the money. When my parents separated, it was hardly amicable and mother and I needed to eat. Movie companies were willing to exploit my famous name. I didn't really understand that at the time."

Plot
As described in a film magazine review, the young son of a wealthy American fails his class in history at school, so he is sent to Turkey to learn the subject firsthand on the premises. He learns that the instructor who flunked him in his exam at school is to be dismissed for it, and he intervenes and gets the school board to retain the man, having first obtained for him a decoration from the Sultan.

Cast

Preservation
With no prints of Stephen Steps Out located in any film archives, it is a lost film.

References

External links

Lantern slide at silenthollywood.com
Long poster daybill

1923 films
American silent feature films
Films directed by Joseph Henabery
Lost American films
1923 comedy films
Silent American comedy films
American black-and-white films
Films set in Turkey
Films based on American novels
1923 lost films
Lost comedy films
1920s American films